The Ellinger Tor is the most famous city gate of Weißenburg in Bayern, Germany. It is from the 14th century and is part of the medieval city wall of Weißenburg.

It was on a Postage Stamp of the Deutsche Bundespost in 1964 and 1967.

References

External links 

 Ellinger Tor website 

Buildings and structures in Weißenburg-Gunzenhausen
Weißenburg-Gunzenhausen